The River to River Greenway is a paved multi-use trail in development in Dakota County, Minnesota, United States.  Phase II, completed in October 2007, is a  segment that parallels Minnesota State Highway 110 from Charlton Street to Dodd Road.

Municipalities along trail corridor
 South St. Paul, MN
 West St. Paul, MN
 Mendota Heights, MN
 Lilydale, MN

Trail connections
 Valley View Park trail

External links
 River to River Greenway

Bike paths in Minnesota
Hiking trails in Minnesota
Protected areas of Dakota County, Minnesota